The Soni Ventorum Wind Quintet was an American wind quintet that was officially founded in 1962 when Pablo Casals asked its members to become the woodwind faculty of his newly founded Conservatory of Music of Puerto Rico.  It is known worldwide for its many international tours sponsored by the United States Department of State including three tours of South America  and three of Europe. Over 25 original chamber works for winds have been written for the members of Soni Ventorum including compositions by Claude Arrieu, William Bergsma, Jean Francaix, Gerald Kechley, Joseph Goodman, John Verrall, and William O. Smith. In 1972 the quintet won the silver medal at the International Instrumental Ensembles Competition (Festival Villa-Lobos) in Rio de Janeiro.

The group had a long and stable history. Through its concerts, tours, and recordings, the Soni Ventorum Wind Quintet established an international reputation. For many years (beginning in 1968)
Soni Ventorum was also the wind quintet-in-residence at the University of Washington School of Music.

History 
The quintet was founded in 1962 by Felix Skowronek, William McColl, Arthur Grossman, James Caldwell, and Christopher Leuba. Members of the ensemble were on faculty at the Conservatory of Music of Puerto Rico, members of the Puerto Rico Symphony, and participants in the annual Casals Festival. During its years in Puerto Rico, the quintet went on several concert tours to the US mainland, which led to recording opportunities with the Lyrichord label.

In 1968 Soni Ventorum was hired by the University of Washington School of Music as the resident Woodwind Quintet.  The group was active through June 2001.

Discography

References

External links 

 The Soni Ventorum Wind Quintet
 
 

American classical music groups
Wind quintets